The Five Eyes (FVEY) is an intelligence alliance comprising Australia, Canada, New Zealand, the United Kingdom, and the United States. These countries are parties to the multilateral UKUSA Agreement, a treaty for joint cooperation in signals intelligence. Informally, Five Eyes can also refer to the group of intelligence agencies of these countries.

The origins of the FVEY can be traced to informal secret meetings during World War II between British and American code-breakers, which started before the U.S. formally entered the war, followed by the Allies' 1941 Atlantic Charter that established their vision of the post-war world. Canadian academic Srdjan Vucetic argues the alliance emerged from Winston Churchill's Iron Curtain speech in 1946, which warned of open conflict with the Soviet bloc unless the English-speaking democracies learned to cooperate:

Neither the sure prevention of war, nor the continuous rise of world organisation will be gained without what I have called the fraternal association of the English-speaking peoples. This means a special relationship between the British Commonwealth and Empire and the United States... the continuance of the intimate relationship between our military advisers, leading to common study of potential dangers..."

As the Cold War deepened, the intelligence sharing arrangement became formalised under the ECHELON surveillance system in the 1960s. This was initially developed by the FVEY to monitor the communications of the former Soviet Union and the Eastern Bloc, although it is now used to monitor communications worldwide.

In the late 1990s, the existence of ECHELON was disclosed to the public, triggering a major debate in the European Parliament and, to a lesser extent, the United States Congress. The FVEY further expanded their surveillance capabilities during the course of the "war on terror", with much emphasis placed on monitoring the World Wide Web. Former NSA contractor Edward Snowden described the Five Eyes as a "supra-national intelligence organisation that does not answer to the known laws of its own countries". Documents leaked by Snowden in 2013 revealed that the FVEY has been spying on one another's citizens and sharing the collected information with each other, although the FVEY nations maintain that this was done legally. It has been claimed that FVEY nations have been sharing intelligence in order to circumvent domestic laws, but only one court case in Canada has found any FVEY nation breaking domestic laws when sharing intelligence with a FVEYs partner.

In spite of continued controversy over its methods, the Five Eyes relationship remains one of the most comprehensive known espionage alliances in human history.

Since processed intelligence is gathered from multiple sources, the intelligence shared is not restricted to signals intelligence (SIGINT) and often involves defence intelligence as well as human intelligence (HUMINT) and geospatial intelligence (GEOINT).

Organisations

The following table provides an overview of most of the FVEY agencies involved in such forms of data sharing.

History

Origins (1941–1950s) 

The earliest origins of the Five Eyes alliance are secret meetings between British and US code-breakers at the British code-breaking establishment at Bletchley Park in February 1941 (before the US entry into the war). A February 1941 entry in the diary of Alastair Denniston, head of Bletchley Park, reading "The Ys are coming!" ("Ys" referring to "Yanks") is the first record, followed by "Ys arrive" on 10 February. The British and US agencies shared extremely confidential information, including the British breaking of the German Enigma code, and the US breaking of the Japanese Purple code. From then key figures travelled back and forth across the Atlantic, including Denniston and code-breaking expert Alan Turing. The practical relationship established for wartime signals intelligence developed into a formal signed agreement at the start of the post-war Cold War.

The formal Five Eyes alliance can be traced back to the Atlantic Charter, which was issued in August 1941 to lay out the Allied goals for the post-war world. On 17 May 1943, the British–U.S. Communication Intelligence Agreement, also known as the BRUSA Agreement, was signed by the UK and U.S. governments to facilitate co-operation between the U.S. War Department and the British Government Code and Cypher School (GC&CS). On 5 March 1946, the secret treaty was formalized as the UKUSA Agreement, which forms the basis for all signal intelligence cooperation between the NSA and GCHQ to this day.

In 1948, the treaty was extended to include Canada, followed by Norway (1952), Denmark (1954), West Germany (1955), Australia (1956), and New Zealand (1956). These countries participated in the alliance as "third parties". By 1955, the formal status of the remaining Five Eyes countries was officially acknowledged in a newer version of the UKUSA Agreement that contained the following statement:

The "Five Eyes" term has its origins as a shorthand for a "AUS/CAN/NZ/UK/US EYES ONLY" (AUSCANNZUKUS) releasability caveat.

Cold War 
During the Cold War (generally accepted to be approximately the period 1947–1991), GCHQ and the NSA shared intelligence on the Soviet Union, the People's Republic of China, and several eastern European countries (known as Exotics). Over the course of several decades, the ECHELON surveillance network was developed to monitor the military and diplomatic communications of the Soviet Union and its Eastern Bloc allies.

During the Vietnam War, Australian and New Zealand operators in the Asia-Pacific region worked directly to support the United States, while GCHQ operators stationed in the (then) British colony of Hong Kong were tasked with monitoring North Vietnamese air defence networks. During the Falklands War, the British received intelligence data from its FVEY allies such as Australia, as well as from third parties such as Norway and France. In the aftermath of the Gulf War, a technician of the ASIS was used by SIS to bug Kuwaiti government offices.

In the 1950s, SIS and the CIA jointly orchestrated the overthrow of Iran's Prime Minister Mohammad Mosaddegh. In the 1960s, SIS and the CIA jointly orchestrated the assassination of the Congolese independence leader Patrice Lumumba. In the 1970s, the ASIS and the CIA jointly orchestrated the overthrow of Chile's President Salvador Allende. During the Tiananmen Square protests of 1989, SIS and the CIA took part in Operation Yellowbird to rescue dissidents from the Chinese regime.

ECHELON network disclosures (1972–2000) 
By the end of the 20th century, the ECHELON surveillance network had evolved into a global system capable of sweeping up massive amounts of private and commercial communications, including telephone calls, fax, e-mail and other data traffic. This was done through the interception of communication bearers such as satellite transmission and public switched telephone networks.

The Five Eyes has two types of information collection methods: the PRISM program and the Upstream collection system. The PRISM program gathers user information from technology firms such as Google, Apple and Microsoft, while the Upstream system gathers information directly from the communications of civilians via fiber cables and infrastructure as data flows past. The program's first disclosure to the public came in 1972 when a former NSA communications analyst reported to Ramparts magazine that the NSA had developed technology that "could crack all Soviet codes". In 1988, Duncan Campbell revealed in the New Statesman the existence of ECHELON, an extension of the UKUSA Agreement on global signals intelligence [Sigint]. The story, 'Somebody's listening,' detailed how the eavesdropping operations were not only being employed in the interests of 'national security,' but were regularly abused for corporate espionage in the service of US business interests. The piece passed largely unnoticed outside of journalism circles.
In 1996, a detailed description of ECHELON was provided by New Zealand journalist Nicky Hager in a book titled "Secret Power – New Zealand's Role in the International Spy Network", which was cited by the European Parliament in a 1998 report titled "An Appraisal of the Technology of Political Control" (PE 168.184). On 16 March 2000, the Parliament called for a resolution on the Five Eyes and their ECHELON surveillance network, which, if passed, would have called for the "complete dismantling of ECHELON".

Three months later, the Temporary Committee on ECHELON was set up by the European Parliament to investigate the ECHELON surveillance network. However, according to a number of European politicians such as Esko Seppänen of Finland, these investigations were hindered by the European Commission.

In the United States, congressional legislators warned that the ECHELON system could be used to monitor U.S. citizens. On 14 May 2001, the U.S. government cancelled all meetings with the Temporary Committee on ECHELON.

According to a BBC report in May 2001, "the US Government still refuses to admit that Echelon even exists."

War on Terror (since 2001) 

In the aftermath of the September 11 attacks on the World Trade Center and the Pentagon, the surveillance capabilities of the Five Eyes were greatly increased as part of the global War on Terror.

During the run-up to the Iraq War, the communications of UN weapons inspector Hans Blix were monitored by the Five Eyes. The office of UN Secretary-General Kofi Annan was bugged by British agents. An NSA memo detailed plans of the Five Eyes to boost eavesdropping on UN delegations of six countries as part of a "dirty tricks" campaign to apply pressure on these six countries to vote in favour of using force against Iraq.

SIS and the CIA forged a surveillance partnership with Libya's ruler Muammar Gaddafi to spy on Libyan dissidents in the West, in exchange for permission to use Libya as a base for extraordinary renditions.

, the Five Eyes also have access to SIPRNet, the U.S. government's classified version of the Internet.

In 2013, documents leaked by the former NSA contractor Edward Snowden revealed the existence of numerous surveillance programs jointly operated by the Five Eyes. The following list includes several notable examples reported in the media:
 PRISM – Operated by the NSA together with GCHQ and the ASD
 XKeyscore – Operated by the NSA with contributions from the ASD and the GCSB
 Tempora – Operated by GCHQ with contributions from the NSA
 MUSCULAR – Operated by GCHQ and the NSA
 STATEROOM – Operated by the ASD, CIA, CSE, GCHQ, and NSA

In March 2014, the International Court of Justice (ICJ) ordered Australia to stop spying on East Timor.  This marks the first such restrictions imposed on a member of the FVEY.

In November 2020, the Five Eyes alliance criticised China's rules which disqualified elected legislators in Hong Kong.

Competition with China (since 2018) 
On 1 December 2018, Meng Wanzhou, a Huawei executive, was arrested by Canadian authorities at Vancouver International Airport, in order to face charges of fraud and conspiracy in the United States.  China responded by arresting two Canadian nationals.  According to the South China Morning Post this conflict was seen by analysts as the beginning of a direct clash between the CCPs leadership of China and members of the Five Eyes alliance.  In the months that followed, the United States placed restrictions on technology exchanges with China.  Following prompting by parliamentarians in Australia and by US Secretary of State Mike Pompeo, the UK Government announced it would reduce the presence of Huawei technology in its 5G network to zero.  The newspaper reported that these events were seen by Beijing as political warfare "waged with the world’s oldest intelligence alliance, the Five Eyes."

In mid-April 2021, the New Zealand Foreign Minister Nanaia Mahuta issued a statement that New Zealand would not let the Five Eyes alliance dictate its bilateral relationship with China and that New Zealand was uncomfortable with expanding the remit of the intelligence grouping. In response, the Australian Government expressed concern that Wellington was undermining collective efforts to combat what it regarded as Chinese aggression. Mahuta's remarks were echoed by New Zealand Prime Minister Jacinda Ardern who claimed that while New Zealand was still committed to the Five Eyes alliance, it would not use the network as its first point for communicating on non-security matters. While The Telegraph defence editor Con Coughlin and British Conservative Member of Parliament Bob Seely criticised New Zealand for undermining the Five Eyes' efforts to put a united front against Beijing, the Chinese Global Times praised New Zealand for putting its own national interests over the Five Eyes.

In late April 2021, the Global Times reported that employees of companies and organisations considered to be "at-risk" of foreign infiltration travelling to the Five Eyes countries would be monitored by the Chinese Ministry of State Security. These employees will be required to report their travel destinations, agendas, and meetings with foreign personnel to Chinese authorities. Other security measures include undergoing "pre-departure spying education" and leave their electronic devices at home and bring new ones abroad. These measures came at a time of heightened tensions between China and the Five Eyes countries.

In mid-December 2021, the United States Secretary of State Antony Blinken along with the Foreign Ministers of Australia, Canada, New Zealand and the United Kingdom issued a joint statement criticising the exclusion of opposition candidates, the Hong Kong national security law, and urging China to respect human rights and freedoms in Hong Kong in accordance with the Sino-British Joint Declaration.  In response, the Chinese Government claimed the Hong Kong elections were fair and criticised the Five Eyes for interfering in Hong Kong's domestic affairs.

Russian Invasion of Ukraine in 2022
In May 2022, Justice ministers from the Five Eyes intelligence network have pledged their support to Ukraine in the prosecution of Russian war crimes. They would also support the investigations of the International Criminal Court (ICC), they said.

Domestic espionage sharing controversy 

In recent years, documents of the FVEY have shown that they are intentionally spying on one another's citizens and sharing the collected information with each other. Although the FVEYs countries claim that all intelligence sharing was done legally and followed the domestic law of each nation.  Shami Chakrabarti, the director of the advocacy group Liberty, claimed that the FVEY alliance increases the ability of member states to "subcontract their dirty work" to each other. The former NSA contractor Edward Snowden described the FVEY as a "supra-national intelligence organisation that doesn't answer to the laws of its own countries". While many claims of illegal intelligence sharing among FVEY nations have been made, only once has any FVEY intelligence agency been shown to have broken the law with intelligence sharing in Canada.

As a result of Snowden's disclosures, the FVEY alliance has become the subject of a growing amount of controversy in parts of the world:

 : In late 2013, Canadian federal judge Richard Mosley strongly rebuked the CSIS for outsourcing its surveillance of Canadians to overseas partner agencies. A 51-page court ruling asserts that the CSIS and other Canadian federal agencies have been illegally enlisting FVEY allies in global surveillance dragnets, while keeping domestic federal courts in the dark.
 : In 2014, the NZSIS and the GCSB of New Zealand were asked by the New Zealand Parliament to clarify if they had received any monetary contributions from members of the FVEY alliance. Both agencies withheld relevant information and refused to disclose any possible monetary contributions from the FVEY. David Cunliffe, leader of the Labour Party, asserted that the public is entitled to be informed.
 : In early 2014, the European Parliament's Committee on Civil Liberties, Justice and Home Affairs released a draft report which confirmed that the intelligence agencies of New Zealand and Canada have cooperated with the NSA under the Five Eyes programme and may have been actively sharing the personal data of EU citizens. The EU report did not investigate if any international or domestic US laws were broken by the US and did not claim that any FVEY nation was illegally conducting intelligence collection on the EU. The NSA maintains that any intelligence collection done on the EU was in accordance with domestic US law and international law. So far, no court case has found the NSA broke any laws while spying on the EU.
 : In 2013, the British Parliament's Intelligence and Security Committee conducted an investigation and concluded that the GCHQ had broken no domestic British laws in its intelligence sharing operations with the NSA. According the investigation "It has been alleged that GCHQ circumvented UK law by using the NSA’s PRISM programme to access the content of private communications. From the evidence we have seen, we have concluded that this is unfounded. We have reviewed the reports that GCHQ produced on the basis of intelligence sought from the US, and we are satisfied that they conformed with GCHQ’s statutory duties. The legal authority for this is contained in the Intelligence Services Act 1994. Further, in each case where GCHQ sought information from the US, a warrant for interception, signed by a Minister, was already in place, in accordance with the legal safeguards contained in the Regulation of Investigatory Powers Act 2000."
 : So far, no court case has been brought against any US intelligence community member claiming that they went around US domestic law to have foreign countries spy on US citizens and give that intelligence to the US.

Other international cooperatives 
Beginning with its founding by the United States and United Kingdom in 1946, the alliance expanded twice, inducting Canada in 1948 and Australia and New Zealand in 1956, establishing the Five Eyes as it remains to this day. Further, there are nations termed "Third Party Partners" that share their intelligence with the Five Eyes despite not being formal members. While the Five Eyes is rooted in a particular agreement with specific operations amongst the five nations, similar sharing agreements have been set up independently and for specific purposes; for example, according to Edward Snowden, the NSA has a "massive body" called the Foreign Affairs Directorate dedicated to partnering with foreign countries beyond the alliance.

Six Eyes (proposed)

Several countries have been prospective members of the Five Eyes. Israel, Singapore, South Korea, and Japan have or continue to collaborate with the alliance, though none are formally members. According to French news magazine L'Obs, in 2009, the United States propositioned France to join the treaty and form a subsequent "Six Eyes" alliance. French President Nicolas Sarkozy required that France have the same status as the other members, including the signing of a "no-spy agreement". This proposal was approved by the director of the NSA, but rejected by the director of the CIA and by President Barack Obama, resulting in a refusal from France.

In 2013 it was reported that Germany was interested in joining the Five Eyes alliance. At that time, several members of the United States Congress, including Tim Ryan and Charles Dent, were pushing for Germany's entrance to the Five Eyes alliance.

Five Eyes Plus
Since 2018, through an initiative sometimes termed "Five Eyes Plus 3", Five Eyes formed associations with France, Germany and Japan to introduce an information-sharing framework to counter threats arising from foreign activities of China as well as Russia.  Five Eyes plus France, Japan and South Korea share information about North Korea's military activities including ballistic missiles, in an arrangement sometimes dubbed "Five Eyes Plus".

Nine Eyes

The Nine Eyes is a different arrangement that consists of the same members of Five Eyes working with Denmark, France, the Netherlands and Norway.

Fourteen Eyes

According to a document leaked by Edward Snowden, there is another working agreement among 14 nations officially known as SIGINT Seniors Europe, or "SSEUR". These "14 Eyes" consist of the same members of Nine Eyes plus Belgium, Germany, Italy, Spain and Sweden.

Further intelligence sharing collaborations

As spelled out by Privacy International, there are a number of issue-specific intelligence agreements that include some or all the above nations and numerous others, such as:

 An area specific sharing amongst the 41 nations that formed the allied coalition in Afghanistan;
 A shared effort of the Five Eyes nations in "focused cooperation" on computer network exploitation with Austria, Belgium, Czech Republic, Denmark, Germany, Greece, Hungary, Iceland, Italy, Japan, Luxembourg, the Netherlands, Norway, Poland, Portugal, South Korea, Spain, Sweden, Switzerland and Turkey;
 Club of Berne: 17 members including primarily European States; the US is not a member;
 Maximator: an intelligence alliance between Denmark, Germany, France, the Netherlands and Sweden
 The Counterterrorist Group: a wider membership than the 17 European states that make up the Club of Berne, and includes the US;
 NATO Special Committee: made up of the heads of the security services of NATO's 30 member countries

See also 

 ABCANZ Armies
 Air and Space Interoperability Council (air forces)
 Allied technological cooperation during World War II
 Anglosphere
 ANZUS — Trilateral security pact between Australia, New Zealand, and the United States
 AUKUS — Trilateral security pact between Australia, the United Kingdom, and the United States
 AUSCANNZUKUS (navies)
 Border Five
 CANZUK
 Combined Communications-Electronics Board (communication-electronics)
 Five Country Conference (immigration)
 Five Nations Passport Group
 Quadrilateral Security Dialogue (QUAD) — Strategic dialogue among Australia, India, Japan and US
 The Technical Cooperation Program (technology and science)
 Tizard Mission
International relations
 Australia–Canada relations
 Australia–New Zealand relations
 Australia–United Kingdom relations
 Australia–United States relations
 Canada–New Zealand relations
 Canada–United Kingdom relations
 Canada–United States relations
 New Zealand–United Kingdom relations
 New Zealand–United States relations
 United Kingdom–United States relations

References

Further reading

External links
 UKUSA Agreement at The National Archives
 UKUSA Agreement at the National Security Agency
 From Insularity to Exteriority: How the Anglosphere is Shaping Global Governance – Centre for International Policy Studies

Anglosphere
Global surveillance
Espionage
Intelligence operations
National security
Espionage scandals and incidents
Australia–United Kingdom relations
Australia–United States relations
Australia–New Zealand relations
Australia–Canada relations
Canada–United Kingdom relations
Canada–United States relations
Canada–New Zealand relations
New Zealand–United Kingdom relations
New Zealand–United States relations
United Kingdom–United States relations